Notre-Dame-des-Champs is a station on line 12 of the Paris Métro in the 6th arrondissement.

History
The station opened on 5 November 1910 as part of the original section of the Nord-Sud Company's line A between Porte de Versailles and Notre-Dame-de-Lorette. On 27 March 1931 line A became line 12 of the Métro. It is named after the nearby Notre-Dame des Champs Church on the Boulevard du Montparnasse and is designed by the architect and engineer Gustave Eiffel. In July 2018, after the France national football team's 2018 World Cup victory, the station was briefly renamed as Notre Didier Deschamps,  the coach that led their team to victory.

This is the main access by subway to the Allée Claude-Cahun-Marcel-Moore and the Alliance Française of Paris.

Station layout

Tiling
The station reflects the style of the Nord-Sud Company. The entrance is original. Like most stations on Line 12, the original tiling on the platform, originally by Boulenger & Co., was hidden behind a metal sheath (carrossage) for forty years. This was removed in 2008, and the entire station was retiled in a replica scheme approximating the original Nord-Sud decor.

Gallery

References

Paris Métro stations in the 6th arrondissement of Paris
Railway stations in France opened in 1910